The Mashonaland Country Districts cricket team was a first-class cricket team representing the Mashonaland province in Zimbabwe. They competed in the Logan Cup from 1993 to 1996. The club played their home matches at the Harare South Country Club.

First-class record

References 

Former senior cricket clubs in Zimbabwe
Former Zimbabwean first-class cricket teams
History of Zimbabwean cricket
Cricket teams in Zimbabwe